"Missing" is a song performed by South Korean boy group Teen Top and is described by TOP Media as "an emotional dance song with a groovy R&B rhythm that highlights the soulful vocals of Teen Top". The song was released on September 14, 2014 together with the remaining songs of the album.

Charts

Sales

Promotions

Live Performances
Teen Top began promoting the single on September 11 on M! Countdown. They followed that will subsequent stages on the various music programs including Mnet's MBC Music's Show Champion , KBS's Music Bank, MBC's Show! Music Core and SBS's Inkigayo.

Music show wins

References

2014 singles
2014 songs
Korean-language songs